Daniel Paul Folk II (August 28, 1927 – May 6, 1975) was an American politician. He served as a member of the South Carolina House of Representatives.

Life and career 
Folk was born in Wauchula, Florida. He attended Denmark High School, Clemson College and Newberry College.

In 1961, Folk was elected to the South Carolina House of Representatives, representing Newberry County, South Carolina.

Folk died in May 1975 at the Newberry County Memorial Hospital, at the age of 47.

References 

1927 births
1975 deaths
People from Wauchula, Florida
Members of the South Carolina House of Representatives
20th-century American politicians
Newberry College alumni